William Oscroft (16 December 1843 – 10 October 1905) was an English professional cricketer who played first-class cricket from 1864 to 1882, mainly for Nottinghamshire County Cricket Club and made 244 known appearances in first-class matches.

Oscroft was a right-handed batsman and a right-arm fast roundarm bowler who occasionally played as a wicket-keeper.  Among the representative teams he played for were the North (1864–1879), the All-England Eleven (1865–1878), the Players (1871–1880) and the United North of England Eleven (1872–1879).

References

1843 births
1905 deaths
English cricketers
English cricketers of 1864 to 1889
Nottinghamshire cricketers
Nottinghamshire cricket captains
North v South cricketers
Players cricketers
United North of England Eleven cricketers
Players of the North cricketers
Over 30s v Under 30s cricketers
All-England Eleven cricketers
R. Daft's XI cricketers